VSL may refer to: 
 VSL(3), VSL#3 a prescribed probiotic treatment
 VSL International, Swiss construction firm
 Value of a Statistical Life, or simply Value of life
 Variable speed of light, a theory in physics
 Venezuelan Summer League, a defunct Minor League Baseball rookie league in Venezuela
 Vernon Systems Ltd, a museums collections management software company based in New Zealand
 Videsh Sanchar Nigam Limited, a company with NYSE stock ticker symbol VSL
 Vienna Summer of Logic, a combination of several major conferences and more than 70 workshops on mathematical logic which took place in July 2014
 Vienna Symphonic Library, a library of musical instrument samples
 Ville Saint-Laurent, a former city that became a borough of Montreal in 2002
 Volume of the Sacred Law, in Freemasonry
 Vorspann System Losinger, an international post-tensioning specialist contractor owned by Bouygues